Steven Serio (born September 8, 1987) is a wheelchair basketball player. As a co-captain of the USA Men's National Wheelchair Basketball Team, he led the American men to their first Paralympic gold medal since 1988 at the 2016 Rio de Janeiro Paralympic Games and defended the gold medal at the 2020 Tokyo Paralympics. He currently plays for the New York Rolling Knicks in the NWBA Championship Division.

He grew up in Westbury, New York and graduated from Carle Place High School in 2005. When Steve was 11 months old, he had surgery to remove a spinal tumor which resulted in the compression of his spinal cord.  Consequently, he was left paralyzed and is classified as an incomplete paraplegic.

Steve began his wheelchair basketball career as a sophomore in high school with the Long Island Lightning, the only competitive junior wheelchair basketball team in New York State.  He was a tremendous asset to this team, eventually leading them to the team's first National Championship in 2005 where was named the tournament MVP. In that same year, he played on a USA U-23 Team played at the Australian Junior National Games for the Disabled in Sydney.

He played point guard for the University of Illinois at Urbana-Champaign. Steve was named a 2nd Team All-American in both the 2005–2006 and 2006–2007 seasons at Illinois.  At the National Intercollegiate Wheelchair Basketball Tournament at Oklahoma State University on March 15, 2008, Steve led the University of Illinois at Urbana-Champaign to a NIWBA Championship over the University of Wisconsin-Whitewater. Steve took home the Championship Game Player of the Game, NWBA Tournament MVP, and the NWBA 31st NIWBT Player of the Year in the process.

Steve also plays on the U.S. Paralympics Men's Wheelchair Basketball Team, which came in second place at the World Championships in Amsterdam in the summer of 2006. In the summer of 2007, the U.S. National Team won a gold medal at the Parapan American Games in Rio de Janeiro, Brazil. Steve made his Paralympic debut with the U.S. National Team in 2008 in Beijing, China. The team finished in fourth place, just missing a medal. Since the disappointing Paralympics, the U.S. National Team took the gold medal at the 2009 America's Cup in Richmond, Canada and finished third at the 2010 Wheelchair Basketball World Championship in Birmingham, England.

He graduated from the University of Illinois at Urbana-Champaign in May 2010, where he studied Kinesiology.

He is currently living in Germany and playing for RSV Lahn-Dill. His contract was recently extended through the 2016 season.

Major achievements

Juniors 
 2005: First place - Junior National Wheelchair Basketball Championships
 2005: Tournament MVP - Junior National Wheelchair Basketball Championships
 2005: Gold medal - World Junior Basketball Championships

Intercollegiate 
 2008: National Champion - U.S. Intercollegiate Wheelchair Basketball
 2008: MVP - NWBA College Division

US National Team 
 2006: Silver medal - IWBF Gold Cup (World Championships), Amsterdam, The Netherlands
 2007: Gold medal - Parapan American Games, Rio de Janeiro, Brazil
 2008: Fourth place - Paralympic Games, Beijing, China
 2008: First place - North American Cup, Birmingham, Alabama
 2009: First place - America's Cup, Richmond, BC, Canada
 2010: Third place - Wheelchair Basketball World Championship, Birmingham, England, UK
 2012: Bronze Medal - Paralympic Games, London, UK
 2016: Gold Medal - Paralympic Games, Rio de Janeiro, Brazil
 2021: Gold Medal - 2020 Summer Paralympics, Tokyo, Japan

Professional 
 2011: German DRS Cup Champion
 2011: German Championship
 2011: IWBF Champions League Silver Medal
 2012: German DRS Cup Champion
 2012: German Championship
 2021:  IWBF Champions Cup Champion

Notes

External links 
 
  (2008, 2016)
  (2012)
 

1987 births
Living people
American men's wheelchair basketball players
Wheelchair category Paralympic competitors
Paralympic wheelchair basketball players of the United States
Paralympic gold medalists for the United States
Paralympic bronze medalists for the United States
Paralympic medalists in wheelchair basketball
Wheelchair basketball players at the 2012 Summer Paralympics
Wheelchair basketball players at the 2016 Summer Paralympics
Wheelchair basketball players at the 2020 Summer Paralympics
Medalists at the 2012 Summer Paralympics
Medalists at the 2016 Summer Paralympics
Medalists at the 2020 Summer Paralympics
Illinois Fighting Illini Paralympic athletes
People from Westbury, New York
People with paraplegia
Sportspeople from Nassau County, New York
American expatriate basketball people in Germany